Samiran (also Romanized as Samīrān, and Semīrān) is a village in Chaharduli Rural District, in the Central District of Asadabad County, Hamadan Province, Iran. At the 2006 census, its population was 224, in 50 families.

References 

Populated places in Asadabad County